The White Princess is a historical drama television miniseries developed for Starz. It is based on Philippa Gregory's 2013 novel of the same name and, to a lesser extent, its 2014 sequel The King's Curse. It is a sequel to the 2013 miniseries The White Queen, which adapted three of Gregory's previous novels, and begins immediately where The White Queen finished.

In the eight episode series, the marriage of Henry VII and Elizabeth of York effectively ends the Wars of the Roses by uniting the houses of Lancaster and York. However, their mutual enmity and distrust, as well as the political plots of their mothers, threaten to tear both the marriage and the kingdom apart.

Cast and characters

Main
 Jodie Comer as Elizabeth "Lizzie" of York, the Queen of England
 Rebecca Benson as Margaret "Maggie" Plantagenet, the Queen's paternal cousin, sister of Teddy
 Jacob Collins-Levy as Henry VII, the King of England, Elizabeth's husband
 Kenneth Cranham as Bishop (later Cardinal) John Morton, a confidant of the King's mother
 Essie Davis as Dowager Queen Elizabeth Woodville, the Queen's mother
 Rossy de Palma as Isabella I of Castile, the Queen of Castile
 Richard Dillane as Thomas Stanley, Margaret Beaufort's husband
 Anthony Flanagan as Francis Lovell, a Yorkist supporter
 Patrick Gibson as Perkin Warbeck, a pretender to the English crown who claims to be Richard of York.
 Caroline Goodall as Cecily Neville, Duchess of York, the Queen's paternal grandmother. Goodall was the only actor to appear in both The White Queen and The White Princess.
 Amy Manson as Catherine "Cathy" Gordon, wife of Perkin Warbeck
 Adrian Rawlins as John de la Pole, Duke of Suffolk, husband of Eliza de la Pole
 Vincent Regan as Jasper Tudor, the King's uncle
 Suki Waterhouse as Cecily of York, the Queen's sister
 Joanne Whalley as Margaret, Duchess of Burgundy, the Queen's paternal aunt
 Andrew Whipp as Sir Richard Pole, husband of Maggie Plantagenet
 Michelle Fairley as  Margaret Beaufort, the King's mother

Recurring
 Nicholas Audsley as Lord Strange
 Rhys Connah (child) and Albert de Jongh (teen) as Edward "Teddy" Plantagenet, Earl of Warwick, the Queen's cousin, brother of Maggie
 Heidi Ely as Princess Bridget, the Queen's sister
 Oliver Hembrough as John de la Pole, Earl of Lincoln, the Duke of Suffolk's son
 Rosie Knightley as Princess Anne, the Queen's sister
 Ava Masters as Princess Catherine, the Queen's sister
 Rollo Skinner as Ned, a stable boy
 Susie Trayling as Elizabeth "Eliza" de la Pole, Duchess of Suffolk, the Queen's paternal aunt
 Guy Williams as William Stanley, Lord Thomas's brother
 Iain Batchelor as Maximilian I, Holy Roman Emperor
 Dorian Grover as Philip
 Zazie Hayhurst as Rettie
 Billy Barratt as Prince Arthur, the King's first son
 Woody Norman as Prince Harry, the King's second son
 Philip Arditti as Rodrigo de Puebla, the Spanish ambassador

Guest
 Ned Elliott as Prince Richard, the Queen's brother
 Luc Webb as Prince Edward, the Queen's brother
 Derek Frood as the Mayor of York
 Kitty Smith as Ruth
 Emmanuelle Bouaziz as Mary of Burgundy
 Max True as Lambert Simnel
 Nia Roberts as Catherine "Kate" Woodville, Duchess of Buckingham
 Norman Arthur Eshley as the Abbot
 Marc Danbury as the Priest
 Juan Echenique as Ferdinand II of Aragon, the King of Aragon
 Nicholas Gecks as the Wimborne Priest
 Alex Sawyer as Kofi, Novice Monk
 Mark Edel-Hunt as Thomas Wolsey
 Alasdair McLaughlin as Noah Luff

Episodes

Production

Development
The 10-part 2013 television series The White Queen adapted Gregory's previous novels The White Queen (2009), The Red Queen (2010) and The Kingmaker's Daughter (2012). The series was broadcast on BBC One in the United Kingdom and on Starz in the United States, and features Freya Mavor as a young Elizabeth of York. Despite initial plans for a second series, on 20 August 2013 the BBC announced they were not commissioning one, possibly because of the lukewarm reception the series received.

However, in October 2013, The Telegraph reported that Starz was planning to develop a sequel miniseries called The White Princess, based on Gregory's novel. Starz CEO Chris Albrecht announced in January 2014 that the network was working with White Queen screenwriter Emma Frost on the project. Starz would produce the White Princess miniseries without involvement from the BBC. Gregory confirmed that the project was underway in August 2015. On 7 February 2016, Gregory announced on Facebook that the sequel was officially confirmed to be in production, with the scripts being written. The series was confirmed to be eight episodes in May 2016.

Jamie Payne, who directed three episodes of The White Queen, directed episodes 1, 2, 3, 7, and 8. Frost was the showrunner and executive producer. Lachlan MacKinnon is served as producer, with Gregory as executive producer. Playground's Colin Callender and Scott Huff also executive produced with Company Pictures' Michele Buck.

Casting
Jodie Comer was cast in the title role of Elizabeth of York in April 2016, with Michelle Fairley added as Margaret Beaufort in May. In June 2016, Starz announced the casting of Essie Davis as Dowager Queen Elizabeth, Jacob Collins-Levy as Henry VII, Suki Waterhouse as Cecily of York, Rebecca Benson as Margaret Plantagenet, and Joanne Whalley as  Margaret, Duchess of Burgundy. The remaining cast includes Caroline Goodall as Duchess Cecily, Kenneth Cranham as Bishop Morton, Vincent Regan as Jasper Tudor and Rhys Connah as Teddy Plantagenet.

Filming
Principal photography began in June 2016, with locations including Bradford on Avon, Bristol, Berkeley Castle, Gloucester Cathedral, Lacock, Salisbury Cathedral, and Wells.

Release
In early January 2017, the producers released a video clip from the series as a teaser trailer. In February 2017, Starz announced that The White Princess would premiere on 16 April 2017. In the UK the series began its satellite and terrestrial broadcasts on the Drama channel on 18 November 2017.

Reception
The miniseries received generally favorable reviews. On Rotten Tomatoes, it has an approval rating of 76% based on reviews from 17 critics, with an average rating of 6.95/10. The website's critics consensus indicated the series was "well-acted and enlivened by its fresh perspective" and "delivers more than enough intrigue to satisfy fans of period British royal court drama." On Metacritic, the show has a weighted average score of 71 based on reviews from 9 critics.

Continuation
On 15 March 2018, Starz announced that it will create a continuation of The White Queen and The White Princess to be titled The Spanish Princess, which will be based on Gregory's novels The Constant Princess and The King's Curse and center on Catherine of Aragon.

References

External links
 
 

2010s American drama television miniseries
2017 British television series debuts
2017 British television series endings
2017 American television series debuts
2017 American television series endings
Costume drama television series
English-language television shows
Henry VII of England
House of Tudor
Serial drama television series
Television shows based on British novels
Television series about the history of England
Television series set in the 15th century
Television series set in the Middle Ages
Works about women in war
2010s British drama television series
Cultural depictions of Margaret Pole, Countess of Salisbury